Achanak is a bhangra group signed to the label Nachural Records. The band has six members headed by lead singer, Vijay Bhatti and are based in the English Midlands.

References

External links
 
 BBC Asian Network Homegrown 05

Bhangra (music) musical groups